He Yizhen (1910–2008) was a Chinese physicist. She contributed to applying spectroscopy to the steel industry in China and to the research in amorphous state physics. Her research specialty in amorphous physics was metallic glass. She filled up the blank of spectroscopy research in China, and became the first person to measure the whole internal friction peak of metallic glass. He Yizhen was one of the founders of the Institute of Solid State Physics of the Chinese Academy of Sciences in Hefei. The research emphases of the institute are nuclear engineering, special metallic materials, and internal friction of solid.

Early life  
He Yizhen was born to a scholarly family as the eldest child in 1910, soon before Qing dynasty, the last dynasty of China, was overthrown. Her father, He Cheng, participated in the Xinhai Revolution which subverted the Qing Dynasty. Because He Cheng contributed to political reform, his family became powerful in the new period of history. The new government, Republic of China, was established in 1912.

When He was born, it was still a common practice for women to bind their feet. Her grandmother, Wang Xiechangda, was an open-minded educator and social activist for women’s rights, who became a prominent influence in He Yizhen's life.  Wang believed that women should go to school and argued against bound feet, established Zhehua Women’s School. Yizhen, along with her seven brothers and sisters, graduated from Zhenhua School.

She had seven siblings: He Zeming, He Zehui, He Zerong, He Zeying, He Zeyuan, He Zecheng, and He Zeqing.  All the eight brothers and sisters became scientists in their own right. Yizhen, Zehui, and Zeying are known as the "Three He sisters" in Chinese scientific circle.

Education 
He graduated at Zhenhua Girls School in 1926 and subsequently attended Ginling College, where she studied Mathematics and Physics.  Following her graduation from Ginling College in 1930, He taught at a missionary school for one year. Her father provided He with a sum of money for either dowry or abroad tuition, with the implicit understanding that he was encouraging her to continue her education. He's two aunts who resided in the United States helped her obtain scholarships from Mount Holyoke College (MHC) and Wellesley College in 1931, where she chose to continue her postgraduate education.  She obtained a Master’s degree in Chemistry and physics from MHC in 1933.  Though He had intended to return to China after her graduation, her mentor recommended her to pursue higher degree. She pursued a doctorate in physics degree from University of Michigan Ann Arbor in 1937 and was awarded Barbour scholarship, which was especially built for Asian women. In her Ph.D. research, He focused on spectroscopy of transition metals.

At the time she was pursuing her postgraduate studies, Chinese women attending college were rare, particularly women studying science.  In China, He's cousin Wang Mingzhen had initially obtained funds from Tsinghua University to study abroad, but ultimately had been refused because the dean of the university refused to provide funding for a woman to study.  He, Wang, and He's sister Zehui would later obtain doctoral degrees in physics from the United States and Germany, despite attempts to dissuade them from continuing to studying physics.

Career 
He returned to China in 1937, at the start of the Second Sino-Japanese War. Her family moved from Suzhou to Beijing. Because of her father’s close friendship with the principal of Yenching University, He obtained a position there as a lecturer. In 1939, He left Beijing and took a position as lecturer in Donghao University in Shanghai.

After her marriage to Ge Tingsui in 1941, He returned to the United States with her husband. Through her previous academic connections, she was recommended for a position at a college and eventually became a research assistant to Dr. Ralph A. Beebe at Amherst College. Her research topic was the measurement of thermal adoption in chemistry, rather than spectroscopy. Because she was pregnant, she only stayed in the position for several months and focused on raising her children, who were born in 1942 and 1947.  She also worked for briefly at Massachusetts Institute of Technology and Metal Research Institute of the University of Chicago. He returned to China in 1949, after founding of the People's Republic of China, and became a professor at Yenching University.

From 1952, He began working at the Institute of Metal Research at the Chinese Academy of Sciences.  Her research focused on improving the production rate of China's nascent steel industry through the application of spectroscopy to alloy steel and slag analysis in steel industry and solved issues in steel production. She published two representative papers: “Effect of Microstructure of Steel on Spectral Analysis” and “Cup Electrode Solution Arc Method for Spectral Analysis of Open Hearth Slag”. On behalf of China, she attended the 6th International Conference of Raman Spectroscopy in 1956, in Holland.

From 1966 to 1976, He's research was interrupted by effects of China's Cultural Revolution. She was forced to endure humiliating punishments as a result of her experience studying abroad and her wealthy background.  In 1969, she was dispatched to rural area Panjin to labor for two months as punishment.

When the Cultural Revolution of China ended in 1976, He continued her theoretical research. She became a pioneer in exploring amorphous state physic and metallic glass fields and measured crystallization internal fraction peak of metallic glass and found a new type of internal fraction peak. Subsequently, she published two formative papers: “Effect of the Isothermal Effectiveness Near the Peak of the Metallic Glass Pd80Si20Tg”, and “A New Peak Near Metallic Glass T”. Her papers won the Second Class Prizes of The State Scientific and Technological Progress Award of Chinese Academy of Science in 1988. She would go on to win the Third Class Prizes of The Natural Science Award of Chinese Academy of Science in 1995 and 1996 and was involved in compiling the book, Amorphous Physics.

In October 1982, she became one of the founders of Institute of Solid State Physics, Chinese Academy of Science. She was one of five scientists who could be called “sir” (an outdated honorific form for intellectuals regardless of gender). He continued her research about metallic glass at the new institute.

Personal life 
In 1941, He Yizhen married Ge Tingsui, an expert in nuclear physics.  Ge later became a leading researcher at the Institute of Metal Research and Institute of Solid State Physics.  They developed a competitive relationship with one another due to their studies in the same field.

The couple met at Yenching University, where He had been a lecturer and was three years older than Ge.  Because He came from a wealthy and influential family, she had a number of admirers; her family did not approve of her relationship with Ge became he came from a poor family and also suffered from pulmonary tuberculosis, for which a valid treatment was not available at the time.  Furthermore, Ge's political beliefs clashed with He's father, who disagreed with Ge's support of the political activism of students.  In opposition to her family's wishes, she married Ge; their marriage became a much-told tale in Chinese academic world and their love letters are still preserved in their biographies.

After their marriage, Ge obtained the opportunity to study in the United States with He, where they remained from 1941 to 1949.  Their two children were born in the United States and eventually became scientists: their daughter Ge Yunpei (1942-2013) was a professor in Shenyang Jianzhu University, while their son Ge Yunjian (born 1947), is an expert in robotics.  The couple returned to China in 1949, where they both worked for the Chinese Academy of Science for decades.  When Ge was dispatched to work in Hefei in 1980, He's husband and children persuaded her to stop her research to join him in Hefei.

Publications (after 1980)

Awards and honors 

 Second Class Prizes of The State Scientific and Technological Progress Award of Chinese Academy of Science in 1988
 Third Class Prizes of The Natural Science Award of Chinese Academy of Science in 1995
 Third Class Prizes of The Natural Science Award of Chinese Academy of Science in 1996

References 

1910 births
2008 deaths
Chinese women physicists
Educators from Shanxi
Mount Holyoke College alumni
People from Jinzhong
People of the Republic of China
People's Republic of China science writers
Physicists from Shanxi
University of Michigan alumni
Wellesley College alumni
Writers from Shanxi
Academic staff of Yenching University
Chinese expatriates in the United States